Andrew P. Wilson (born 1886), was a British director, playwright, teacher, and actor. He acted as General Manager for the Abbey Theatre in Dublin, Ireland in 1914-15.  There, he produced his own play, The Slough, about Irish poor. He was also one of the co-creators of the Scottish National Players (1921–1924).

In 1924 he directed a series of silent films adapted from the golf stories of P.G. Wodehouse.  The films featured actor Harry Beasley as a caddie who observes the humorous dramas of various golfers, thus providing a connective tissue between the short films.  (In the short stories, this function is performed by The Oldest Member of a golfing club.)

Wilson wrote radio plays for the BBC, including the series Sandy and Andy that ran between 1936 and 1947.

He was born in Edinburgh, Scotland.

Selected filmography
 Ordeal by Golf (1924)

External links

Plays written during World War 1 on the Great War Theatre website

1886 births
Year of death missing
Scottish film directors
Scottish dramatists and playwrights
Scottish theatre managers and producers